The 1964 European Nations' Cup round of 16 was the second round of the qualifying competition for the 1964 European Nations' Cup. It was contested by the thirteen winners from the preliminary round, along with Austria, Luxembourg and the Soviet Union, who had received a bye. The winners of each of eight home-and-away ties progressed to the quarter-finals. The matches were played in 1963.

Qualification

Each tie winner progressed to the round of 16. The round of 16 was played in two legs on a home-and-away basis. The winners of the round of 16 would go through to the quarter-finals.

Summary

|}

Matches
The eight matches took place over two legs, taking place in 1963.

Spain won 2–1 on aggregate and advanced to the quarter-finals.

Sweden won 3–2 on aggregate and advanced to the quarter-finals.

Denmark won 4–1 on aggregate and advanced to the quarter-finals.

Luxembourg won 3–2 on aggregate and advanced to the quarter-finals.

Republic of Ireland won 3–2 on aggregate and advanced to the quarter-finals.

France won 3–2 on aggregate and advanced to the quarter-finals.

Soviet Union won 3–1 on aggregate and advanced to the quarter-finals.

Hungary won 5–4 on aggregate and advanced to the quarter-finals.

Goalscorers

References

External links
Matches at UEFA.com

 2
1962–63 in Spanish football
1963–64 in Spanish football
1962–63 in Northern Ireland association football
1963–64 in Northern Ireland association football
1962–63 in Yugoslav football
1963–64 in Yugoslav football
1963 in Swedish football
1963 in Danish football
1962–63 in Albanian football
1963–64 in Albanian football
1963–64 in Dutch football
1963–64 in Austrian football
1963–64 in Republic of Ireland association football
1963–64 in Bulgarian football
1963–64 in French football
1963 in Soviet football
1963–64 in Italian football
1963–64 in Hungarian football
1963–64 in East German football
Q2
Q2
Q2
Q2